Daur is a town and headquarters of Daur taluka located in the district Shaheed Benazir Abad (Nawabshah), Sindh, Pakistan. Daur is a hub for agriculture and animal farms. It was badly damaged by the floods in 2010.

References

Populated places in Sindh